The Ukrainian Catholic Eparchy of Volodymyr–Brest (Volodymyr–Brėst of the Ukrainians) was a suffragan eparchy of the Metropolis of Kiev, Galicia and all Ruthenia in the Ruthenian Uniate Church. It was situated in the Polish–Lithuanian Commonwealth in parts of the modern states of Ukraine and Belarus under Imperial Russian rule, from 1569 until 1833.

History 
 It was established in 1596 as Eparchy (Diocese) of Volodymyr–Brėst / Volodymyr–Brest (English) / Vladimiren(sis)–Bresten(sis) Ruthenorum (Latin), on imperial Russian territory previously not served by the rite
 Suppressed in 1833, without direct successor.

Episcopal ordinaries
(all Ukrainian Rite)

Suffragan Eparchs (Bishops) of Volodymyr–Brėst
 Hipacy Adam Pociej, Basilian Order of Saint Josaphat (O.S.B.M.) (1596 – 1600.11.15), next Metropolitan Archeparch (Archbishop) of Kyiv–Halyč of the Ukrainians (Ukraine) (1600.11.15 – death 1613.07.18)
 Joakym Morokhovskyj, O.S.B.M. (1613 – death 1631.03.19)
 Józef Bakowiecki-Mokosiej, O.S.B.M. (1632 – death 1654)
 Jan Michał Pociej, O.S.B.M. (1655 – death 1666)
 Benedykt Gliński, O.S.B.M. (1666 – death 1678)
 Lev Slubyč-Zalenskyj, O.S.B.M. (1678 – 1695.09.19), next Metropolitan Archeparch (Archbishop) of Kyiv–Halyč of the Ukrainians (Ukraine) (1695.09.19 – death 1708.08.24)
 Lev Luka Kiszka, O.S.B.M. (1711 – 1714.09.17), next Metropolitan Archeparch (Archbishop) of Kyiv–Halyč of the Ukrainians (Ukraine) (1714.09.17 – death 1728.11.19)
 Lev Luka Kiszka, O.S.B.M. (1711 – death 1728)
 Korneliusz Lebiecki, O.S.B.M. (1729.09.03 – death 1730.01.22)
 Teodozy Teofil Godebski, O.S.B.M. (1730 – death 1756.09.12), previously Eparch (Bishop) of Pinsk–Turaŭ of the Ruthenians (Belarus) (1720 – 1730)
 Felicjan Filip Wołodkowicz (Feliks Filipp Volodkovič), O.S.B.M. (1758.11.22 – death 1778.02.01), previously Eparch (Bishop) of Chełm–Bełz of the Ukrainians (Poland) (1731 – 1756.01.12), Coadjutor Archbishop of Kyiv–Halyč of the Ukrainians (Ukraine) (1756.01.12 – 1762.07.18); later (also) Metropolitan Archeparch (Archbishop) of Kyiv–Halyč of the Ukrainians (1762.07.18 – 1778.02.01)
 Symeon Młocki, O.S.B.M. (1779.09.19 – 1795)
 Josafat Bułhak, O.S.B.M. (1798.10.12 – 1818.09.22), also Apostolic Administrator of Vilnius of the Ukrainians (Lithuania) (1814 – 1818), Apostolic Administrator of Kyiv–Halyč of the Ukrainians (Ukraine) (1817.01.27 – 1818.09.22); previously Eparch (Bishop) of Pinsk–Turaŭ of the Ruthenians (Belarus) (1787.04.24 – 1798.10.12); later Eparch (Bishop) of Vilnius of the Ukrainians (Lithuania) (1818 – 1833.04.14), Metropolitan Archbishop of Kyiv–Halyč of the Ukrainians (Ukraine) (1818.09.22 – 1838.03.09), Eparch (Bishop) of Žyrovyci of the Ukrainians (Lithuania) (1828 – 1833.04.14), Archeparch (Archbishop) of Polatsk–Vitebsk of the Ruthenians (Belarus) (1833.04.14 – 1838.03.09)
 Coadjutor Bishop: Antin Zubko (1833.12.11 – 1839.03.25), no other prelature.

See also 
 List of Catholic dioceses in Belarus
 List of Catholic dioceses in Ukraine

Sources and external links 
 GCatholic - data for all sections

Volodymyr–Brest
Metropolis of Kiev, Galicia and all Ruthenia (Ruthenian Uniate Church)
Eparchies of the Ruthenian Uniate Church
Volodymyr–Brest
Former dioceses in Europe
History of Brest, Belarus
History of Volyn Oblast
1596 establishments
Religious organizations established in the 1590s
16th-century establishments in Poland
1596 establishments in Ukraine
Religious organizations disestablished in 1833
1830s disestablishments in Poland
19th-century disestablishments in Belarus
19th-century disestablishments in the Russian Empire